The Governor of Indiana is elected to a four-year term and responsible for overseeing the day-to-day management of the functions of many agencies of the Indiana state government.

1816–1850

Under the original constitution  of 1816, the state held gubernatorial elections every three years. The first election was held before statehood was approved, in August 1816. Until the constitution was replaced in 1851, elections were held in October, and winners took office in December.

1851–1971

In 1851, Indiana adopted its second and current constitution, which banned governors from serving consecutive terms and lengthened terms to four years. Elections since then have been held on Election Day in November during years divisible by four, concurrent with presidential elections.

1972–present

In 1972 a constitutional amendment allowing governors to serve two consecutive four-year terms was approved.

References

Bibliography

 
Quadrennial elections
Elections